Watts Bar Dam is a hydroelectric dam on the Tennessee River in Meigs and Rhea counties in Tennessee, United States.  The dam is one of nine dams on the main Tennessee River channel operated by the Tennessee Valley Authority, which built the dam in the early 1940s to provide flood control and electricity and to help create a continuous navigable channel along the entire length of the river.  The dam is the technical boundary between the  Watts Bar Lake— which it impounds— and Chickamauga Lake, which stretches from the dam's tailwaters southward to Chattanooga.

Watts Bar Dam is named for Watt Island, a sandbar located at the dam site prior to the dam's construction.

Location

Just north of the dam, the Tennessee absorbs the Piney River, which flows down from the Cumberland Plateau to the west. The nearest towns of note are Spring City (a few miles to the northwest) and Decatur (a few miles to the south). Tennessee State Route 68 crosses Watts Bar Dam, connecting the area with Interstate 75 to the east and U.S. Route 27 to the west.

Capacity
In addition to its main Tennessee River channel, Watts Bar Lake is navigable across the lower  of the Clinch River (up to Melton Hill Dam) and the lower  of the Emory River. The cities of Kingston, Spring City, Harriman, Loudon, Rockwood, and Lenoir City all have waterfronts on Watts Bar Lake.  
  

Background and construction

Watt Island's potential as a dam site had been recognized since the early 1870s, when the U.S. Army Corps of Engineers built a dike at the tip of the island to improve flow in the main river channel.  The Corps carried out dredging work at the island between 1911 and 1913 that deepened the main channel, and recommended the site (originally known as the "White Creek site" after a stream that joins the Tennessee a few miles upriver) for a dam in 1930.  In 1936, the Tennessee Valley Authority assumed direction of the site as part of its unified strategy to build (and acquire) a series of dams along the Tennessee River to improve navigation and flood control, and aide in the region's economic development.  TVA was given authorization to build a dam at Watt Island on March 16, 1939, and construction on Watts Bar Dam began on July 1, 1939.

An earthen dike was built to protect downtown Kingston from the reservoir's backwaters, and minor adjustments were necessary to the riverfronts of Spring City, Harriman, Wheat, and Loudon. The community of Rhea Springs, located along the Piney River a few miles upstream from the river's mouth, was completely inundated.

The dam's original design called for the installation of three generators, but with the outbreak of World War II in 1941, energy demand in the region skyrocketed, and the design was modified to include a fourth and fifth generator.  The dam was completed and the gates closed on January 1, 1942.  The first generator went online February 11 of that year, followed by the second generator on April 6 and the third on July 23.  The fourth generator went online March 12, 1944 and the fifth followed on April 24, 1944.  The Army Corps of Engineers designed the dam's lock, which went into operation on February 16, 1942.

Watts Bar Lake was one of the water bodies affected by a massive release of fly ash in 2008 from the Kingston Fossil Plant coal fly ash slurry spill.

See also

Dams and reservoirs of the Tennessee River
List of crossings of the Tennessee River
Watts Bar Nuclear Generating Station

References

External links

TVA: Watts Bar Reservoir

Dams on the Tennessee River
Dams in Tennessee
Bridges over the Tennessee River
Hydroelectric power plants in Tennessee
Tennessee Valley Authority dams
Buildings and structures in Meigs County, Tennessee
Buildings and structures in Rhea County, Tennessee
Dams completed in 1942
Energy infrastructure completed in 1942
Energy infrastructure completed in 1944
Road bridges in Tennessee
1942 establishments in Tennessee